Franz Rentsch (born 11 January 1943) is a Swiss rower. He competed at the 1968 Summer Olympics and the 1972 Summer Olympics.

References

1943 births
Living people
Swiss male rowers
Olympic rowers of Switzerland
Rowers at the 1968 Summer Olympics
Rowers at the 1972 Summer Olympics
Rowers from Zürich